KZLD may refer to:

 KZLD-LP, a low-power radio station (95.3 FM) licensed to serve Houston, Texas, United States
 KXOF-CD, a low-power television station (channel 31) licensed to serve Laredo, Texas, which held the call sign KZLD-LP from 1999 to 2005